The Ministry for Foreign Affairs of the German Democratic Republic (abbreviated MfAA) was a government body of the German Democratic Republic (East Germany) that existed from 1949 to 1990. It had its seat at Schinkelplatz in Berlin-Mitte. A new building was constructed in 1964-1967 and used by the foreign ministry, but demolished in 1996 after German reunification.

The Ministry for Foreign Affairs was led by the Foreign Minister of the German Democratic Republic and a number of deputies. However, the Foreign Minister had less actual influence over the foreign policy than the central committee secretary for foreign policy in the Socialist Unity Party of Germany. As a de facto subordinate position, the Foreign Minister could be a member of some of the block parties in East Germany.

The West German counterpart to the Ministry was the Federal Foreign Office. The office still serves as the current German foreign ministry, considering itself to be the direct continuation of the Foreign Office of the North German Confederation, established in 1870.

Literature 
 Hermann Wentker: Außenpolitik in engen Grenzen. Die DDR im internationalen System (= Schriftenreihe der Vierteljahrshefte für Zeitgeschichte). Oldenbourg Wissenschaftsverlag, München 2007. .

External links 

Foreign Affairs
Foreign relations of East Germany
1949 establishments in East Germany
German Democratic Republic
1990 disestablishments in East Germany
Demolished buildings and structures in Berlin
Buildings and structures demolished in 1996